Dimitrios Tairis (born 3 December 1989) is a Greek professional footballer who plays as a goalkeeper for Super League 2 club Kalamata.

Career
Tairis' professional career began in 2009 at the age of 19 when he signed a contract with Panthrakikos. In the 2009–10 season, he was a member of the Panthrakikos U21 and simultaneously played with Panthrakikos' first squad.

Career statistics
Last update: 28 June 2010

References

External links

Panthraxstats 2008–2009 & 2009–2010

1989 births
Living people
Greek footballers
Greek expatriate footballers
Association football goalkeepers
Panthrakikos F.C. players
Niki Volos F.C. players
Apollon Smyrnis F.C. players
AEL Kalloni F.C. players
Trikala F.C. players
Ayia Napa FC players
Cypriot Second Division players
Greek expatriate sportspeople in Cyprus
Expatriate footballers in Cyprus
Footballers from Thessaloniki